The Riga Autobus Factory (RAF) was a factory in Jelgava, Latvia, making vans and minibuses under the brand name Latvija.

History

Origins, Riga period 
During the Soviet period, RAF and UAZ were the only producers of vans and minibuses in Soviet Union. RAF vans and minibuses were used only by state enterprises, most often as ambulances and for public transit. Private persons were not allowed to own them, the only exception being for families with at least five children.

In 1949 the factory began producing van bodies on the site of the Riga auto repair factory No.2 (commonly known as RARZ). In 1955, it was renamed the Riga Experimental Bus Factory, and the products started to be abbreviated to RAF. It would become the main Soviet producer of minibuses.

RAF's first product was the RAF-251, a 22-seat local bus, based on the GAZ-51 chassis (which RAF also built), with a wood and metal body. There was also a passenger- and freight version (Kombi), the 251T, with a payload of 14 passengers and  cargo.

From 1958, the factory started to produce RAF-977 minibuses, based on GAZ-21 Volga engine (between the front seats, rather like the Dodge A100; the engine was accessible through an inside hatch), transmission, axles, and steering. It was planned to produce passenger ("route taxis" for airports, and for sporting teams), freight, mail, and ambulance versions of the vehicle, to replace the modified estates then in use. Drawing inspiration from the VW Type 2, it had a front-mounted water-cooled  engine (based on the Volga's, with a lower compression ratio), and seated ten. It debuted in 1957, and ten were built for display at that year's Moscow Youth Festival, leading to a proposed name Festival. The first batch was produced in 1959, under the new RAF 977 name. It got  and could reach , the majority of those being hand-built.

In 1965, RAF proposed two prototypes, with the hope of persuading Minavtoprom to finance a new factory: a conventional version, comparable to the Ford Transit (dubbed the RAF 962-I), or a forward control version, similar to the Renault Estafette (dubbed the 962-II). RAF management, in a rare move for a Soviet company, created two competing teams to individually design a new van. The conventional 962-I was selected, which seemed less likely to provide the money for an all-new facility. So RAF tried to persuade the selection committee to adopt the more radical 962-II, and did.

A one-tonne variant was based on a modernized 977D chassis. However, the factory size was not large enough to put this model into mass production, and therefore it was moved to ErAZ (Yerevan, Armenia).

Move to Jelgava, decline and collapse 
Construction of a new factory in Jelgava (to build the new 962-II, now known as the RAF-2203 Latvia) was begun 25 July 1969, and finished in February 1976.  It was designed to produce 17,000 vehicles per year. The factory produced several versions of the RAF-2203, which was widely sold in the Soviet Union and exported, mainly to Socialist bloc and aligned nations.

The massive factory created profound challenges for Soviet-occupied Latvia. During its planning, local economists warned that the project was unfeasible in the long term, but were ignored by the Soviet government. Due to a lack of local manpower, workers from all around the Soviet Union were brought to Jelgava, increasing the already high levels of immigration and putting strain on local infrastructure and the ethnic relations between Latvians and the mostly Russian-speaking newcomers. The proportion of Latvians living in Jelgava shrank from 80% to less than 50% during the Soviet times. An entirely new neighbourhood of Jelgava, bearing the RAF name, was built.

In addition, even with the imported workforce, the factory suffered from a lack of qualified manpower: engineers (later on, also conscript soldiers of the Soviet Army) were made to work on the production line; quality issues were rampant and well-known, in some days all of the manufactured vehicles turned out to be defective. Even the large factory in the end turned out to be too small (with a planned yearly output of just 12,000 cars per year) to install important machinery, slowing down production. A heavy blow for the factory came during Perestroika – around 1986 the factory was stripped of the State quality mark of the USSR. In 1987, the factory organized one of the first open management contests in the USSR, with Viktor Bossert from Omsk elected as Director by the factory workers. Bossert tried to improve quality, even announcing a competition with Renault's Trafic van, but couldn't overcome the ineffective supply chain of the Soviet planned economy and the lack of incentive and competition due to guaranteed tenders from the Gossnab. He left the factory in 1990.

By the beginning of the 1990s, the RAF-2203 was completely outdated and the factory set about designing a new model. The original plan was to build a new RAF vehicle to be called the M1 "Roksana”, designed with help from the British consultancy International Automotive Developments. The model was successfully displayed at several auto salons, but never got further than a prototype. The same thing happened to the front-wheel drive 1994 RAF M2 'Stils' (“Style”) microbus.

After the collapse of the USSR, the new borders broke the supply chains and production fell drastically. An investment proposal came from the Russian GAZ company, but it was rejected by the Latvian government which considered Russian capital a threat to Latvian independence. Although some Western and East Asian investors also showed their interest in RAF, all of them considered this investment too risky as the local economy was too small to support large production and the Russian market was virtually closed due to the volatile Russian economy and a complicated political relationship between Russia and Latvia. The large factory, largely dependent on parts and materials brought from outside Latvia, required a lot of resources for its maintenance and was described by some investors as the only valuable asset of the factory. Another blow was the popularity of the Russian GAZelle van, unveiled in 1994.

In 1997, the last batch of 13-seat RAF-22039s was released. The last automobile produced by the dying giant was the RAF-3311 — a hearse.

In 1998, RAF went bankrupt. The only part of the company that survived was RAF-Avia, a charter airline set up using the four airplanes owned by the plant. The  manufacturing site, complete with machinery, is owned by JSC Balitva. They considered selling it to a western automaker, but this proved unrealistic. As of 2002, the assembly shop was still in order and all the design documents existed, so production could be started again if there should be a need. ErAZ expressed interest, but probably only for the designs.

After the bankruptcy of RAF, factory's buildings and land were purchased by SIA Baltiva for 150 thousand lats (later known as SIA NP Jelgava Business Park). Shortly after, company's shares were transferred to the Nordic Partners group, which was originally financed by the Icelandic businessman Gisli Reyninsson (Icelandic: Reynisson Gisli). On the estates purchased, SIA NP Jelgava Business Park developed an industrial park with a total area of 23 ha.

Legacy 
Rumors came out in 2018 of RAF being revived as "Rīgas Autobusu Fabrika, RAF" was registered in a Latvian company database. It is believed they will show off their first new model in 2019 and start production in 2020. It was also believed that RAF will now focus on electric powered vehicles like vans and trolleybuses.

Surviving prototypes of the plant are on display at the Riga Motor Museum, as well as production models in other institutions.

Models 
 RAF-251 - GAZ-51 based bus (1955–1958)
 RAF-8 - Moskvitch 407 based 8-passenger prototype bus (1957)
 RAF-10 - GAZ-M20 based 9-11-passenger bus (1957–1959)
 RAF-982 - experimental bus
 RAF-977 Latvija - GAZ-21 based 10-passenger van/bus/ambulance/taxi (1959–1976). Also made in D, DM and IM models.
 RAF-2203 Latvija - 4x2 4dr van (1976—1997)
 RAF-2203 Latvija (delivery) - 4x2 4dr delivery van
 RAF-2203 Latvija (cardiology) - 4x2 4dr cardiac ambulance
 RAF-2203 Latvija (fire) - 4x2 4dr fire minivan
 RAF-2203 Latvija GAI - 4x2 4dr police van
 RAF-2203 Latvija (mail) - 4x2 4dr mail van
 RAF-2203 Latvija (taxi) - 4x2 4dr taxi van
 RAF-2203 Latvija VAI - 4x2 4dr military police van
 RAF-22031 Latvija - 4x2 4dr ambulance
 RAF-2907 - special car for Summer Olympic in Moscow
 RAF-2914 - 4x2 ambulance van
 RAF-3311 Latvija - 4x2 pickup on RAF-2203 chassis 
 RAF-33111 Latvija - 4x2 light truck on RAF-2203 chassis
 RAF Latvija - collector - 4x2 cash collector on RAF-2203 chassis
 RAF Latvija - tourist van, motor home
 RAF M1 'Roksana' Prototype minivan (1991)
 RAF M2 'Stils' Prototype minivan (1994)

References

External links 

 RAF (Photo, info..)
 http://www.autogallery.org.ru/raf.htm
 http://www.abc.se/~m9805/eastcars/showbrand.php?brand=latvia&lang=en

 
Bus manufacturers of the Soviet Union
Buildings and structures in Jelgava
1955 establishments in Latvia
Vehicle manufacturing companies established in 1955